Ferenc Móra (19 July 1879 – 8 February 1934) was a Hungarian novelist, journalist, and museologist.

Life

Ferenc Móra was born in Kiskunfélegyháza, into a financially poor family. His father Márton Móra was a tailor, and his mother Anna Juhász was a baker. He acquired his formal education under the most extreme hardships because of the financial poverty of his family. At the Budapest University he earned the degree of Geography and History education but worked as a teacher only for one year at Felsőlövő, Vas county. He was a prominent figure of youth literature in Hungary.  His parallel career of museology started in 1904 at the combined library and museum of Szeged serving the county capital of Szeged and its surrounding Csongrád county. He was appointed as the director of the combined library and museum of Szeged and Csongrád county in 1917 and served in that post as director until 1934, when he died, aged 54, at Szeged.  Today the museum is named in his honor as the "Móra Ferenc Muzeum" which can be seen on the internet at many websites.

Major literary works

All listed books were published in Budapest.
Rab ember fiai "Sons of the Slave Man" (1909)
Mindenki Jánoskája "Everybody's Little Johnnie" (1911)
Csilicsali Csalavári Csalavér (1912)
Filkó meg én "Filkó and I" (1915)
Kincskereső kis ködmön "The Treasure-seeking Little Jacket" (1918)
Dióbél királyfi "Prince Walnutmeat" (1922)
A festő halála "Death of the Painter" (1921), novel later published as Négy apának egy leánya "Four Fathers' One Daughter"
Georgikon (1925)
Nádihegedű "Reed Fiddle" (1927)
Ének a búzamezőkről "A Song about Wheat Fields" (1927), novel
Beszélgetés a ferdetoronnyal "Conversation with the Leaning Tower" (1927)
Véreim "My Descendants" (1927)
Sokféle "Diverse" (1927)
Egy cár, akit várnak "A Tzar Who is Waited for" (1930)
Aranykoporsó "Golden Coffin" (1932), historical novel
Daru-utcától a Móra Ferenc-utcáig "From Crane Street to Móra Ferenc Street" (1934), autobiography
Utazás a földalatti Magyarországon "A Journey in the Underground Hungary" (1935)
Parasztjaim "My Peasants" (1935)
Dióbél királykisasszony "Princess Walnutmeat" (1935)
Napok, holdak, elmúlt csillagok "Suns, Moons, Bygone Stars" (1935)

References

External links 
 

1879 births
1934 deaths
People from Kiskunfélegyháza
Hungarian writers
Hungarian children's writers